Untitled is the only album from the nu metal band Five Pointe O. The album was released on March 19, 2002 via Roadrunner Records.

Background
The album's only single, "Double X Minus", received airplay on MTV2's Headbangers Ball and Kerrang! TV. "The Infinity" was featured on the Resident Evil soundtrack.

Reception

Exclaim! compared the album favorably to the early music of Linkin Park.

Track listing
 "Double X Minus" – 3:22
 "King of the Hill" – 5:02
 "Art of Cope" – 3:12
 "Purity 01" – 4:12
 "Freedom?" – 4:38
 "Sympathetic Climate Control" – 5:16
 "Untitled" – 3:51
 "Syndrome Down" – 4:01
 "Breathe Machine" – 2:46
 "The Infinity" – 4:26
 "Aspire, Inspire" – 11:47

Personnel
Band

 Daniel Struble – vocals
 Eric Wood – guitar, backing vocals
 Sharon Grzelinski – guitar
 Sean Pavey – bass
 Tony Starcevich – drum
 Casey Mejia – keyboard, piano

Production

 Colin Richardson - production, mixing, engineering
 Justin Leeah - engineering
 Alan Douches - mastering

References

2002 debut albums
Five Pointe O albums
Roadrunner Records albums
Albums produced by Colin Richardson
Albums recorded at Sonic Ranch